HMS Triumph was a 74-gun third-rate ship of the line of the Royal Navy, launched on 3 March 1764 at Woolwich.

In 1797, she took part in the Battle of Camperdown, and in 1805 Triumph was part of Admiral Calder's fleet at the Battle of Cape Finisterre.

The bladders containing the mercury soon ruptured, poisoning the crew with mercury vapour.

Triumph was on harbour service from 1813 but was not broken up until 1850.

Notes

References

 Lavery, Brian (2003) The Ship of the Line - Volume 1: The development of the battlefleet 1650-1850. Conway Maritime Press. .

External links
 M. P. Earles: A Case of Mass Poisoning With Mercury Vapour on Board H.M.S. Triumph at Cadiz, 1810. In: Medical History. July 1964, vol. 8(3), p. 281–286, online at NCBI
 National Maritime Museum - HMS Triumph in 1808

Ships of the line of the Royal Navy
Valiant-class ships of the line
Ships built in Woolwich
1764 ships